Rhabditophora (from rhabdito-, rhabdite + Greek -φορος [-phoros], bearer, i.e., "rhabdite bearers") is a class of flatworms. It includes all parasitic flatworms (clade Neodermata) and most free-living species that were previously grouped in the now obsolete class Turbellaria. Therefore, it contains the majority of the species in the phylum Platyhelminthes, excluding only the catenulids, to which they appear to be the sister group.

The clade Rhabditophora was originally erected by Ulrich Ehlers in 1985 based on morphological analyses and its monophyly was later confirmed by molecular studies.

Description
Rhabditophorans are characterized by the presence of lamellated rhabdites, rodlike granules secreted in the cells of the epidermis and consisted of concentric lamellae. They are absent in the clade Neodermata, most likely due to a secondary loss of this feature because their epidermis is turned into a syncytium in adult forms.

Another important synapomorphy of the group is the duo-glandular adhesive system. It is a structure of the epidermis containing three different cell types: anchor cells, adhesive glands and releasing glands. The adhesive glands secrete an adhesive substance that attaches the anchor cells to a surface, while the releasing glands secrete a substance able to release the anchor cells from surfaces. This systems allows rhabditophorans to adhere and release quickly from the substrate, even several times in a second.

The secretory organs of rhabditophorans, the protonephridia, also have a unique anatomy in which the flame cells and tube cells present a series of cytoplasmic projections that overlap, forming a two-cell 'weir'.

Systematics
The following orders are recognised in the subphylum Rhabditophora:

Class ?
 Order Bothrioplanida
 Order Fecampiida
 Order Gnosonesimida
 Order Polycladida
 Order Prolecithophora
 Order Prorhynchida
 Order Proseriata
 Order Rhabdocoela
 Order Tricladida
 Superorder Macrostomorpha
 Genus Bradynectes
 Genus Myozona
 Family Haplopharyngidae
 Family Macrostomidae
 Order Dolichomicrostomida
 Superclass Neodermata (parasites)
 Class Cestoda
 Subclass Cestodaria
 Order Amphilinidea
 Order Gyrocotylidea
 Subclass Eucestoda
 Order Bothriocephalidea
 Order Caryophyllidea
 Order Cathetocephalidea
 Order Cyclophyllidea
 Order Diphyllidea
 Order Diphyllobothriidea
 Order Lecanicephalidea
 Order Litobothriidea
 Order Onchoproteocephalidea
 Order Phyllobothriidea
 Order Rhinebothriidea
 Order Spathebothriidea
 Order Tetrabothriidea
 Order Tetraphyllidea
 Order Trypanorhyncha
 Class Monogenea
 Subclass Monopisthocotylea
 Order Capsalidea
 Order Dactylogyridea
 Order Gyrodactylidea
 Order Monocotylidea
 Order Montchadskyellidea
 Subclass Polyopisthocotylea
 Order Chimaericolidea
 Order Diclybothriidea
 Order Lagarocotylidea
 Order Mazocraeidea
 Order Polystomatidea
 Class Trematoda
 Subclass Aspidogastrea
 Order Aspidogastrida
 Order Stichocotylida
 Subclass Digenea
 Order Diplostomida
 Order Plagiorchiida

References 

 
Protostome classes